Mack Bryggeri (Norwegian official name: Macks Ølbryggeri AS) is a brewery in Balsfjord, Norway. It is the world's northernmost brewery, producing in Nordkjosbotn since 2012.

History
Mack Bryggeri was founded during 1877 in Tromsø by Ludwig Markus Mack (1842–1915), son of a German immigrant, businessman and local politician. He had been educated as a baker, like his father, but several trips to visit his brewmaster uncle in Bavaria led him to pursue construction of a brewery in northern Norway. As a result, Mack beers were, and still remain, particularly German in character.

A large portion of the shares are presently owned by Ludwig Mack's descendants. Mack Bryggeri claims to be the northernmost brewery in the world, a claim that is cited on Mack's beer bottles. After over 130 years of operation in Tromsø, in March 2012 the company moved production to Nordkjosbotn in Balsfjord municipality, and subsequently lost the title of world's northernmost brewery to the brewery operated inside the Hotel Icefiord in Ilulissat (Greenland) by a margin of a mere 50 meters. When Hotel Icefjiord closed their brewery in 2013, the brewery equipment was taken over by Brewery Immiaq (also Ilulissat), who since then holds the title of "world's northernmost brewery".
In 2015 Svalbard Bryggeri filled their fermentors and subsequently are the northernmost brewery in the world at 78 degrees North.

Beers

Mack Freeze – gluten-free, alcohol-free beer
Mack Freeze Premium – dark, alcohol-free beer
Mack pilsner – a pilsner with relatively much ground
Mack Haakon – a stronger lager which has won several awards
Arctic Beer – a slightly lighter pilsner than Mack Pilsner
Mack 1877
Mack Bayer 
Mack Fatøl 
Mack Nordlys
Mack Midnattsol
Mack Sommerøl
Mack Isbjørn
Mack Isbjørn lite
Mack Isbjørn Boks 0.5 – light Pilsner 
Mack Brown Ale – 4.5% & 6.5%
Mack Porter – 4.5% & 6.5%
Mack Hefe Weissbier – 4.5% & 6.5%
Mack Witbier – Belgian wheat beer – 4.5% & 6.5%
Mack IPA – India Pale Ale – 4.5% & 6.5%
Mack Gull (Gold) – strong beer – 6.5%
Mack Bokøl – dark strong beer – 6.5%

Softdrinks
Mack Brus with lemon flavor
 
Mack Grapesoda
 
Mack Julebrus
 
Rødebillys Rødbrus
 
Fruktsjimpanse
 
Bad Limes

Cider and IceTea

Mack Cider Strawberry & Lime

Mack Cider Peach & Raspberry

Mack Cider Cactus & Lime
 
Mack Cider Pear
 
Ice Tea Lime 4,5%
 
Ice Tea Peach 4,5

Water

Arctic Water Sparkling
 
Arctic Water Still
 
Arctic Water Apple
 
Arctic Water Lime
 
Arctic Water Raspberry
 
Arctic Water Juice Lemon

Arctic Water Juice Pear

Gallery

References

Related reading
Sanner, J. Mack's bryggeri gjennom 75 år. 1877–1952 (Tromsø. 1953)
Høeg, E. I. Bryggerieier Ludvig Macks etterslekt ( Larvik. 1994)

External links
Mack Brewery home page 
Mack Brewery home page - English site

Breweries in Norway
Food and drink companies established in 1877
Companies based in Tromsø
Companies based in Troms
Companies based in Nordkjosbotn
Buildings and structures in Tromsø
Norwegian companies established in 1877